Stiltner was a small unincorporated community that developed at the mouth of Brush Creek, a tributary of Twelvepole Creek, in Wayne County, West Virginia, United States.

In 1969, Stiltner and the surrounding area were permanently submerged under the constructed East Lynn Lake.

Stiltner had a Post Office.   A former variant name was Fry; the present name honors the local Stiltner family.

References 

Unincorporated communities in West Virginia
Unincorporated communities in Wayne County, West Virginia